The 2022 MPBL season, also known as the MPBL Mumbaki Season, was the fourth season of the Maharlika Pilipinas Basketball League (MPBL). The season began on April 25, 2022 and ended on December 12, 2022, thus marking the first time since the inaugural 2018 season where the season ran throughout a single calendar year.

Although the Davao Occidental Tigers were the league's defending champions, after defeating the San Juan Knights in the 2021 MPBL Finals, the team didn't participate this season. The Basilan Jumbo Plastic, the 2021 Invitational champions, also didn't participate.

After going undefeated in the regular season, the Nueva Ecija Rice Vanguards defeat the Zamboanga Family's Brand Sardines in the 2022 MPBL Finals, three games to one, to become the 2022 champions.

This season marked the first season of a partnership with sports betting platform OKBet.

Format 
 Just like in previous seasons, all teams will play in a single round-robin regardless of division. Each team will have 21 games in their schedule.
 A series of games are played during gamedays, with the final game usually having the home team participating.
 At the end of the group stage, if there are games which were postponed during the regular season, the game/s shall be played especially if there will be significant effects in the standings after these games are played.
 If there are ties in the standings, these will be broken via the following criterion: 1. Head-to-head matchup, 2. Point difference against each other 3. Record vs. the other division, and if necessary, the quotient system.

Transactions

Coaching changes

Team changes

Participation changes 
Five teams returned to the league, marking the first such occurrence, with the Bataan Risers, Batangas City Atheltics, Pampanga Giant Lanterns, Quezon City Capitals, and Zamboanga Family's Brand Sardines making their first appearance since the 2019-20 season.

Five teams from the 2021 Invitational did not return for the regular season. Of those teams, the Basilan Jumbo Plastic, the 2021 Invitational champions, has yet to make a return. The Bicol Volcanoes, Bulacan Kuyas, Iloilo United Royals, and Negros Muscovados would all return in the 2023 season.

In total, 22 teams participated in this season, which was a decrease from 31 teams in the 2019-20 season.

Team realignment 
The Rizal Golden Coolers were moved back to Southern Division, where the team was during the 2018–19 season, making it the team’s second consecutive realignment.

Name changes 
 The All-Star Bacolod Ballers changed its name to Bacolod Bingo Plus before the start of the season.
 The Batangas City Athletics changed its name to Batangas City Embassy Chill before the start of the season.
 The Imus Buracai de Laiya changed its name to Imus Bandera before the start of the season. 
 The Makati FSD Blazers changed its name to Makati × MNL Kingpin before the start of the season.
 The Marikina Shoe City changed its name to Marikina Shoemasters before the start of the season.
 The Mindoro EOG Burlington changed its name to Mindoro Tams before the start of the season.
 The Pasig Sta. Lucia Realtors changed its name to Pasig City before the start of the season, then later as Pasig City MCW Sports before the 2022 MPBL Playoffs.
 The Valenzuela MJAS Zenith changed its name to Valenzuela XUR Homes Realty Inc. before the start of the season.

Pre-season

The 2022 MPBL season was preceded by the 2021 MPBL Invitational which started on December 11, 2021, at the Mall of Asia Arena, Pasay.

Notable events 
 October 7, 2022 – The Nueva Ecija Rice Vanguards beat the Batangas City Embassy Chill to become the first team in league history to go undefeated in the regular season.
 October 10, 2022 – Kyt Jimenez of the Sarangani Marlins completed a quadruple-double against the Mindoro Tams with 33 points, 13 rebounds, 11 assists, and 11 steals at Paco Arena in Manila, thus becoming the first player in league history to record such a statistic.

Regular season 
The regular season began on April 25, 2022 at Batangas City Coliseum in Batangas City, home arena of the Batangas City Embassy Chill.

Team standings

Northern Division

Southern Division

Results

Not all games are in home–away format. Each team plays every team once. Number of asterisks after each score denotes number of overtimes played.

Playoffs 

Teams in bold advanced to the next round. The numbers to the left of each team indicate the team's seeding in its division, and the numbers to the right indicate the number of games the team won in that round. Teams with home-court advantage, the higher-seeded team, are shown in italics.

Bracket

Northern Division

First round
In the first round, the teams were grouped into two groups. The No. 1 and the No. 4 teams hosted alternately, while the No. 2 and No. 3 teams did the same, with the top two seeds hosting game 3 if they are still in contention.

|}

Division Semifinals 
The top two remaining seeds hosted alternately, with the top remaining seeded team hosting game 3 if they are still in contention.

|}

Division Finals 

|}

Southern Division

First round
In the first round, the teams were grouped into two groups. The No. 1 and the No. 4 teams hosted alternately, while the No. 2 and No. 3 teams did the same, with the top two seeds hosting game 3 if they are still in contention.
{{ThreeLegResult| 

|}

Division Semifinals 
The top two remaining seeds hosted alternately, with the top remaining seeded team hosting game 3 if they are still in contention.

|}

Division Finals 

|}

MPBL Finals 

|}

Awards 
The individual league awards was given during the Game 2 of the 2022 MPBL National Finals at Nueva Ecija Coliseum.

All-Star game 
The third All-Star game took place at Batangas City Coliseum in Batangas City on October 2, 2022.

Lineups

Game

 MPBL All-Star MVP: Jaycee Marcelino 
 Slam Dunk Contest Champion: Garex Puerto 
 3-point Shootout Champion: Domark Matillano

Statistics

Individual statistical leaders

Media coverage 
This season marked a shift in broadcasting rights, as the games were broadcast on One PH and One Sports+. MPBL also streamed all of the games through Facebook, YouTube, and Kumu, while iWantTFC still handled international streaming.

References 

Maharlika Pilipinas Basketball League
2022–23 in Philippine basketball leagues